Lance King (born November 23, 1962) is an American heavy metal music singer and songwriter specializing in melodic progressive power metal. He has sung with many groups over the last 35 years and started the record label Nightmare in 1990 to release his own music, and is currently still at the helm of the label.

Career

Freelance years
An American hard rock band: 1981–86

As a performing musician since 1981, King has sung with many bands in his career, in 1981 the summer after he graduated high school in Winona, MN, King was asked by a few musician friends that he had jammed with in the past to join a small weekend club band called "The News" The band focused mainly on Canadian rock covers and after a couple shows they decided to change the name of the band to "Freelance". During his five years with the band from (1981–1986) Freelance began playing local bars on the weekends, almost every weekend, then the band reached out to talent agents in the Twin cities and the band began playing farther and wider, by 1983 they were doing club shows, from British Columbia, and Idaho to Michigan in an old school bus they had renovated and dubbed "the urban insult vehicle", mostly due to the fact that they had simply painted it primer grey, so it was not school bus yellow anymore. Freelance did create 10 songs of original material and played these live, but never recorded them properly and thus are lost to the world.

Gemini years
An American Hardrock / Metal band: 1986–1993

In 1986, when freelance was beginning to fall apart, King joined a Rochester, Minnesota-based band Gemini. Gemini had been playing a circuit of clubs and ballrooms in the tri-state area of Minnesota, Iowa and Wisconsin for over ten years when King joined in 1986 they were a cover band playing as much new wave as they were corporate rock, after a year King gave the band an ultimatum, that either they started writing songs and trying to move to the next level or King was moving on to something else. After somewhat of a power play, King managed to become the driving force in the band and in 1988 they started breaking into the clubs in the Minneapolis and Saint Paul market, eventually dethroning the reigning club champions of the day in the premier rooms "The Mirage" and the "Iron Horse" while also playing many other rooms. Gemini was doing exceptionally well with their show attendance, normally having between 700 and 1000 people a night at their shows, playing over 250 shows a year, they started having major labels coming to the shows. The band was courted by labels and managers but nothing solid was ever offered by the major labels due to the band only having a few originals at the time. The manager's contract King deemed unworthy of the band. So Gemini continued to play shows and write in the clubs during the days, testing the new material on the crowds at night, and every month saving enough to record a couple of their new tunes they felt strongly enough about. By 1990 the band had released its first self-titled, self-financed and self-produced an album on King's own label Nightmare records... "Coming Home" was picked up by local station 93X and pirate radio station Z-Rock, the troop's station in Iraq during Operation Desert Storm as well as several regional broadcast stations from Minnesota and Iowa. The band began extending their shows reach by playing major markets in Kansas City, Chicago, Milwaukee, Winnipeg and all points in-between in an effort to build. The line up had continual lineup changes of second guitarists, drummers, and bassists, the only consistency was King and guitarist Rob Kruger. Kruger and King switched off on vocals, guitar and keyboards during the band three-hour shows. In 1992 Gemini released their second album Out for Blood. With the demanding schedule of playing so many shows consistently over the last several years, the band was wearing on each other due to too many chemicals and lack of sleep. In 1993 King departed to start his own band "The Kings Machine".

Kings Machine years
An American Progressive Hard Rock/Metal band: 1993–2000

Immediately King began auditioning players in 1993 for his new solo project "The Kings Machine", joining forces with former "Touched" guitarist Dave Barilla.  Armed with a four-track and hunger the two wrote over 15 songs before finding suitable players; drummer Todd Silverstone and bassist /keyboardist Brian Hollenbeck. The newly formed band immediately found themselves opening for such rock icons as David Lee Roth, Great White, Slaughter and Cinderella and released a four-song EP simply called "sampler plate EP" in early 1994. The band recorded a 24 track digital recording with a multi-camera shoot for a local cable rock TV show called "On the Rocks", produced by renowned FOH engineer Sandy Marks. Shortly before recording began for the band's first full-length album, drummer Todd Silverstone left the group to join former TOTO vocalist Fergie Frederiksen.  Silverstone was replaced two weeks before the band went into the studio to record their 1995 album "A State of Mind" with drummer Brian Waterman. King recorded the band's first full-length release in his home studio wearing both engineer and producer hats.  The band had also recorded another full-length album's worth of material that has never seen the light of day outside of the live shows. After a couple of major lineup changes, TKM was reconfigured into a glorified cover band and fell apart when King was touring in Europe with Balance of Power in 2000.

Balance of Power years
A British/American Progressive Metal band: 1997–2003

In 1997, King was asked to demo up a few songs for British band Balance of Power Balance of Power had already released one album "When the World Falls Down" in 1996 via Point Music/Metal Heaven into Europe and via Pony/Canyon Japan. The band was getting a nice advance from each label which totaled $50,000 plus publishing The band offered King a weekly fee of $1500 a week to record and tour plus performance royalties and expenses, and King said yes!  The band immediately flew King to London, England and they recorded all the vocals for their second album "Book of Secrets" in ten days' time. This was quite a turn around album for Balance of Power since they had just replaced their guitarist Paul Curtis with Pete Southern, and the direction became much heavier and more progressive with both King and Southern on board, taking the band far from their AOR roots. The band hired "the voice of the BBC Rob Brown" for narration segments on the concept album and drummer /producer Lionel Hicks flew out to Minneapolis to mix the album with King, since he liked what King had done with the demo mixes. They mixed the album in Logic recording studio's where King had mixed the first Gemini record with Brian Bart assisting at the board.

Both Labels loved the change, and so did the media and the fans. "Book of Secrets" getting extremely high marks in all the reviews getting "album of the month" and even covers on several of the largest magazines in Europe. In Japan, Burrn Magazine ranked King as #1 best vocalist in Rock/Metal for the year 1998. The band was excited and was offered a tour with Bruce Dickenson due in part to Dickenson sharing bassist Chris Dale with Balance of Power. However King did not find out about the opportunity until way after the fact, due to one of the members in Balance of Power turning the tour down for personal reasons. So the band immediately focused on writing their third album Ten More Tales... with King again flying from Minneapolis/St. Paul, Minnesota to London, England to record his parts, this time in only seven days.  Again Hicks flew out to mix the record with King and this time they chose to work at OarFin Studio's downtown Minneapolis with the golden ears of house engineer Todd Fitzgerald. The band worked out a gentlemen's agreement with King to release both Book of Secrets and Ten More Tales... to North America on Nightmare and Ten More Tales of Grand Illusion was released simultaneously to Europe, Japan, and North America in the spring of 1999.

A European tour opening slot was offered to Balance of Power with co-headliners "Axis" and "Pink Cream 69" and in the summer of 2000, the band toured extensively. Then it was on to the fourth album to be called Perfect Balance, this album again had all pre-production recording happening in London in Lionel Hicks POD studios, but this time, the entire band flew out to King's home studio where he and original singer, now returned bassist Tony Ritchie recorded all vocals for the Perfect Balance album, after which Hicks and King again mixed and mastered the album with Fitzgerald at OarFin.
Perfect Balance was released in 2001. Chris Beck, of HM magazine called it a "superior album in almost every way" when comparing it to the band's previous efforts. He also said the album "had excellent singing, musicianship, and production".

In 2003, the band parted ways with singer King after some disagreements. In an interview with HM magazine, King said that "unfortunately we couldn't work together anymore - some business, and some of it personal, mostly because King was not part of the bands "company". Guitarist Pete Southern said in another interview that Lance's departure was "never about music", but attributed it to the "business side" of their relationship. In June 2003, they recruited singer John K, from Biomechanical and released the album Heathen Machine who left after one album and a brief tour.

In 2005, the band released their first compilation of hits, entitled Heathenology. This package included a DVD with live footage of the band, plus a collection of tracks from previous albums featuring many performances of King both video and recorded.

Pyramaze years
A Danish / American Power-Prog Metal band: 2003–2007

Pyramaze was formed in 2001 by guitarist Michael Kammeyer. Next to join were fellow Danes drummer Morten Sørensen (Wuthering Heights) and bassist Niels Kvist. American keyboardist Jonah Weingarten, who originally met Kammeyer over the Internet, joined next. The band then set out in search of a singer. After listening to many demos, the band selected King to be their lead vocalist. King recorded all his own vocals from his personal studio and sent digital tracks to the band producer Jacob Hansen in Denmark via internet in 2003 where Kammeyer and Hansen Mixed and mastered the first two Pyramaze albums "Melancholy Beast" and "Legend of the Bone Carver".
The band's first live shows took place on April 23 and 24, 2004, in Minneapolis, Minnesota. They released their debut studio album, Melancholy Beast, in May 2004 and followed with a European tour over the summer of 2004. During this time, Danish guitarist Toke Skjønnemand joined the group. In February 2006, the band released their second album, "Legend of the Bone Carver", a concept album that was received extremely well by the worldwide metal media and fans. The band did a few club warm-up shows and then major festivals in Denmark, France, the United Kingdom, and Germany.  On September 15, 2006, the band performed at the ProgPower USA VII festival in Atlanta, Georgia. Shortly after that performance, on November 9, 2006, King sent out a press release saying that he and the band were parting ways. On April 14, 2007, former Iced Earth vocalist Matt Barlow returned to the metal scene as Pyramaze's new singer.  On December 11, 2007, Jon Schaffer announced on his Web site that Barlow had re-joined Iced Earth. Barlow finished recording Immortal with Pyramaze before leaving to work solely with Iced Earth.

Solo years: 2010–present
In June 2011, King conceptually arranged for a concept album based on his life and the 11:11 time prompt phenomena, emailing his ideas and rough demos of songs he had created to musicians he desired to write alongside. In just three months, with the help of friends, contemporaries and business associates Jacob Hansen (Beyond Twilight, Invocator & Anubis Gate), Kim Olesen (Anubis Gate), Michael Harris (Darkology, Thought Chamber), Tore St Moren (Jørn), Fred Colombo (Spheric Universe Experience), Markus Sigfridsson (Darkwater & Harmony), Kevin Codfert (Adagio), Michael Hansen & Shane Dhiman (Phonomik), Morten Gade Sørensen (Pyramaze, Wuthering Heights), Elyes Bouchoucha, Malek Ben Arbia, and Anis Jouini (Myrath), Mistheria (Bruce Dickinson, and many others, the album, called A Moment in Chiros after the Kairos Moment of Greek rhetoric and Christian theology, was written and recorded in three short months. It was released via Nightmare Records via Sony/Red to North America on November 7, 2011 (though originally intended for November 11, 2011 in complement with the album title), and distributed digitally and physically throughout the world by distribution partners of Nightmare Records on 11/11/11. $1.11 from each sale of A Moment in Chiros will support efforts combating human trafficking, one of the fastest-growing criminal activities worldwide, through an organization called NOT FOR SALE

In 2017, King began work on his second solo album, he wanted to return to doing live shows again, his hiatus from the stage began in early fall of 2010 after almost 30 years of live performances.

In 2018, he joined a Minneapolis/Saint Paul based 1980s rock tribute show, called "Legacy of the Loud".  He performs regionally with this band as a side project and continues to do so into 2020.

During 2019 and early in 2020, King received many accolades for his 2019 release "ReProgram", massive airplay, and video response for his three released singles "Limitless", Reaction Formation" and "Pointing Fingers". King was listed on many magazines 10 albums of 2019 and even received "Best Comeback album of the Year" from Sonic Perspectives.

Side projects
Empire - German hard rock band featuring members of Whitesnake, Black Sabbath, Hammerfall, and Rainbow (2001)

Defyance - American progressive metal band (2002)

Mattsson - Power Games Finish progressive metal (2003)

Shining Star - Brazilian melodic hard rock (2003–05)

Avian - American heavy metal band featuring Megadeth bassist David Ellefson (2005–10)

Decibel - Twin Cities-based hard rock cover band (2000–10)

Krucible - American progressive metal band (2007–10)

King has produced a huge back catalog of original material over the years released via many different record companies around the world including, Pony Canyon-Japan, Point Music-Germany, Massacre-Germany, King-Japan, Replica-France, Melodic Heaven-South Korea, Metal Heaven-Germany, Avalon/Marquee-Japan, Toshiba/EMI-Japan, Rubicon-Japan, Advantage-Brazil, Frontline Rock-Brazil, Silent- Brazil, CD Maximum-Russia and of course his own label in North America Nightmare Records.

In 1990, King founded the St. Paul, Minnesota-based Nightmare Records, which specializes in hard rock, progressive metal and power metal and has a large selection of positive metal, spiritual and Christian metal bands and artists from around the world. Nightmare has licensed 100's artists and has distributed thousands of releases over the years. King founded the label originally to release Gemini's self-titled album, not wanting to turn over all rights and creative license to many major labels and managers he encountered in the late 1980s.

In 2008, he started doing a one-hour radio show called The Sunday Hour of Progressive Power on Sundays broadcast from Norway on MetalExpressRadio.com, shortly after he had ten other stations, some internet, and some broadcast adding the show and it became syndicated and the name of the show was changed to The Stellar Hour of Progressive Power because it was effectively playing seven days a week on one or more stations. He did the show weekly until fall of 2013. You can still hear rebroadcasts of the 189 show's he independently produced on MetalExpressRadio, PowerProgRadio and PureRockRadio as well as several shows in a media player at Nightmare Records website.

In 2013, King released his own brand of coffee "Awakenings" a smooth dark roast he sells via the Nightmare Records website.

In 2013 and 2014, King recorded 15 songs with Australian band Ilium for a special dual disc release that will be the band's sixth album release, previous vocalist for Ilium was Mike DeMio (formerly of Riot and Masterplan). Mixes were completed on the album in late July 2014 and sent to King to master, release date pending.

Vocal style
King is a tenor with a plus four-octave range of (G♯1-)C♯2 to G♯5, able to sing very comfortably in both baritone and high tenor in full voice and up to second soprano in falsetto. He is known for singing in many different melodic rock and metal styles and non modal voicings, but mostly for his traditional blending of power, melodic and progressive metal/hard rock vocals, with a warm, rich tone.

Personal life
King was brought up in a New Age family, and for several years was a Christian, he actually considers himself more of a Jedi. His hobbies include martial arts, specifically Muay Thai, Kali, Jiu Jitsu and Jeet Kune Do, graphic arts, boating, motorcycles, part grease monkey part carpenter, part numbers guy and all about vocal person. He took up stage acting in musicals in 2010 and has performed major roles in six running productions, in addition to running his hard rock/metal record label Nightmare Records (in association with Sony/RED/The Orchard).

King also started a weekly hour radio show called The Sunday Hour of Progressive Power or just The S.H.O.P.P. on Metal Express Radio that was syndicated on to over 20 radio stations (both internet and broadcast) that took the show to seven days a week. The show was renamed The Stellar Hour of Progressive Power played that was on air for five years until the strain of a weekly show with the rest of his life became too much.

He is married and has two children with whom he lives in Twin Cities, Minnesota.

Discography

As a solo artist 
ReProgram (March 29, 2019) - Nightmare Records (world) in association with Sony/Red Music distributed by The Orchard.
A Moment in Chiros (2011) - Nightmare Records (world), Rubicon Records (Japan)

Ilium
My Misanthropia (2015) - Nightmare Records (world) Release date March 24, 2015

Avian
Ashes and Madness (2008) Nightmare Records (world)
From the Depths of Time (2005) Nightmare Records, (North America), Massacre Records (Europe), Hot Rockin' (Japan)

Pyramaze
Legend of the Bone Carver (2006) Avalon/Marquee (Japan), Massacre (Europe), NTS (France), Nightmare (North America, USA & Canada)
Melancholy Beast (2004) - EMI (Japan), Massacre (Europe), Nightmare (North America), NTS/Replica (France), Silent (Brazil), Melodic Heaven (South Korea),

Shining Star
Enter Eternity (2005) - Nightmare Records (North America), Frontline (Brazil)

Balance of Power
Heathenology (2005) - Massacre Records (Europe)
Perfect Balance (2001) - Massacre Records (Europe) Nightmare (North America), Avalon/Marquee (Japan), Irond Records (Russia)
Ten More Tales of Grand Illusion (1999) - Massacre Records (Europe), Nightmare (North America), Pony Canyon (Japan), Frontline Rock (Brazil-South America)
Book of Secrets (1998)- Point Music (Europe), Nightmare (North America), Pony Canyon (Japan), Frontline Rock (Brazil-South America)

Mattsson
Power Games (2003) - Lion Music (Europe, North America), King Records (Japan)
War (2005) - Lion Music (Europe, North America), King Records (Japan)

Defyance
Transitional Forms (2002) - Nightmare Records (World)

Empire
Hypnotica (2000) Lion Music (world except Japan) King Records (Japan)

The Kings Machine
A State of Mind (1995) - Nightmare Records (world)

Gemini
Out for Blood (1992) - Nightmare Records (world)
Gemini (1990) - Nightmare Records (world)

See also
Ascension Theory (2002)

References

External links
Official website

1962 births
Living people
American heavy metal singers
American male singers
American male songwriters
American record producers
American male martial artists
Place of birth missing (living people)
Empire (German band) members